John Cochrane (August 27, 1813 – February 7, 1898) was an American lawyer, Union Army general and politician who served two terms in the  U.S. House of Representatives from 1857 to 1861.

Early life
John Cochrane was born in Palatine, New York on August 27, 1813, the grandson of John Cochran, Surgeon General of the Continental Army. He studied first at Union College, but then graduated from Hamilton College in 1831. While attending Union College, he became a member of the Sigma Phi Society.  Afterwards he studied law, was admitted to the bar in 1834, practiced in Oswego and Schenectady, and then moved to New York City.

Career
In 1852, he campaigned for Franklin Pierce who appointed him Surveyor of the Port of New York in 1853.

Tenure in Congress 
He was a Democratic member of the 35th and 36th United States Congresses, serving from 1857 to 1861, where he took a prominent part in the debates on land reform, revenue, and other public questions.

Civil War 
At the outbreak of the American Civil War he became a colonel of the 65th New York Volunteer Infantry (also known as the 1st United States Chasseurs), which he commanded in the Peninsular Campaign.  In July 1862, he was promoted to brigadier general of volunteers, but resigned his commission in February 1863, ostensibly on account of failing health but more likely as a result of his political maneuverings after Fredericksburg. Before that date, he had commanded a brigade under Brigadier General John Newton of the VI Corps. This brigade was present at the Battle of Fredericksburg. Cochrane had also agitated for the removal of Ambrose Burnside as commander of the Army of the Potomac. Alexander Shaler replaced Cochrane as commander of the brigade.

Later political career 
Cochrane was New York State Attorney General from 1864 to 1865, elected on the ticket which was nominated by the Union State Convention including Republicans and War Democrats.

In 1864, he was nominated by the Radical Democracy Party for the vice-presidency on the ticket with John C. Frémont, but Frémont soon withdrew. He was a delegate to the 1868 Republican National Convention.

As leader of the New York delegation to the Liberal Republican Convention at Cincinnati in 1872, he was instrumental in securing the nomination of Horace Greeley for the presidency.

Afterwards he became a Democrat again, and was elected a Sachem of Tammany Hall. In 1872 and 1873, he was President of the Common Council of New York City. As such he was Acting Mayor of New York when Mayor A. Oakey Hall temporarily retired during the Tweed investigation.

Personal life
Cochrane, who was a member of the Society of the Cincinnati, died at his home at 7 East Sixty-Second Street in Manhattan, and was buried at Albany Rural Cemetery in Menands, New York.

See also

List of American Civil War generals (Union)

References

Sources

 Retrieved on August 17, 2008
Staff (September 16, 1863) Nomination for New York State Attorney General, The New York Times
Staff (February 9, 1898) Obituary, The New York Times
Political Graveyard entry
List of New York Attorneys General Office of the New York State Attorney General

1813 births
1898 deaths
Military personnel from New York City
Hamilton College (New York) alumni
Union Army generals
People of New York (state) in the American Civil War
New York State Attorneys General
Burials at Albany Rural Cemetery
New York (state) Republicans
Radical Republicans
New York (state) Liberal Republicans
Democratic Party members of the United States House of Representatives from New York (state)
Schuyler family
19th-century American politicians
Members of the United States House of Representatives from New York (state)